Arc reactor may refer to:

 Arc reactor (Marvel Cinematic Universe), a fictional power source in the Marvel Cinematic Universe
 an apparatus for producing C60 and other fullerenes
 Plasma arc waste disposal reactor, a kind of waste processing system
 ARC fusion reactor (affordable, robust, compact), a theoretical design for a compact fusion reactor developed by the Massachusetts Institute of Technology